Pejoratively, a kitchen sink regression is a statistical regression  which uses a long list of possible independent variables to attempt to explain variance in a dependent variable. In economics, psychology, and other social sciences, regression analysis is typically used deductively to test hypotheses, but a kitchen sink regression does not follow this norm. Instead, the analyst throws "everything but the kitchen sink" into the regression in hopes of finding some statistical pattern.

This type of regression often leads to overfitting (i.e. misleadingly suggesting relationships between independent and dependent variables in the data, which can lead to hasty generalizations). The reason for this is that the more independent variables are included in a regression, the greater the probability that one or more will be found to be statistically significant while in fact having no causal effect on the dependent variable—that is, the more likely the results are to be afflicted with Type I error.

The kitchen sink regression is an example of the practice of data dredging.

References
 

Regression variable selection
Misuse of statistics
Economics catchphrases